"" ("Let's drink from the joyful cups") is a famous duet with chorus from Giuseppe Verdi's La traviata (1853), one of the best-known opera melodies and a popular performance choice (as is this opera itself) for many great tenors. The song is a brindisi, a lively song that encourages the drinking of wine or other alcoholic beverages.

Scene 
The duet is performed in the first act of the opera, during a late-night party at Violetta Valéry's house. It is sung by Violetta and Alfredo Germont, a young man who is in love with her. Alfredo is convinced by his friend Gastone and by Violetta to show off his voice. He begins this drinking song, later joined by Violetta and the rest of the company.

The piece is written in B-flat major, its time signature is 3/8, and the tempo is marked Allegretto,  = 69.

Libretto 
Francesco Maria Piave wrote the text.

References

External links 
; Renata Tebaldi and Gianni Poggi duet on 1954
 "Libiamo ne' lieti calici", piano-vocal score, Italian and English, William and Gayle Cook Music Library, Indiana University School of Music

Opera excerpts
Male–female vocal duets
Compositions by Giuseppe Verdi
1853 compositions
Compositions in B-flat major
Tenor arias
Soprano arias